Nancha is a county in Heilongjiang Province, China. It is under the administration of the prefecture-level city of Yichun. The county was re-organized from the former Nancha District by Chinese State Council in 2019. The county seat is Lianhe Subdistrict.

Administrative divisions 
Nancha County is divided into 3 towns and 1 township. 
3 towns
 Nancha, Chenming, Haolianghe
1 township
 Yingchun

Notes and references 

Nancha